

The Moosjisee (also Mossjesee, Mosjesee, Moosjesee) is a reservoir in the Findeltal valley above Zermatt in the Swiss canton of Valais. The lake is located at an elevation of  slightly north of the Findelbach river.

The reservoir is used for power generation and snowmaking. It is fed in part by the glacial milk of the Findel Glacier and therefore gets its characteristic milky turquoise color.

Access 
Moosjisee is the second to last of the five lakes on the Five Lakes Walk, which leads from Blauherd to Sunnegga.

References 

Lakes of Valais